The Latin numerals are the words used to denote numbers within the Latin language. They are essentially based on their Proto-Indo-European ancestors, and the Latin cardinal numbers are largely sustained in the Romance languages. In Antiquity and during the Middle Ages they were usually represented by Roman numerals in writing.

Latin numeral roots are used frequently in modern English, particularly in the names of large numbers.

Overview
The Latin language had several sets of number words used for various purposes. Some of those sets are shown in the tables below.

Cardinal numerals

The cardinal numerals are the ordinary numbers used for counting ordinary nouns ('one', 'two', 'three' and so on):

The conjunction  between numerals can be omitted: .  is not used when there are more than two words in a compound numeral: . The word order in the numerals from 21 to 99 may be inverted: . Numbers ending in 8 or 9 are usually named in subtractive manner: . Numbers may either precede or follow their noun (see Latin word order).

Most numbers are invariable and do not change their endings:
 (Livy)
'Ancus reigned for 24 years'

However, the numbers 1, 2, 3, and 200, 300, etc. change their endings for gender and grammatical case.  'one' declines like a pronoun and has genitive  (or ) and dative :

The first three numbers have masculine, feminine and neuter forms fully declined as follows (click on GL or Wh to change the table to the American order as found in Gildersleeve and Lodge, or Wheelock):

 (Catullus)
'let us value them (at the value) of a single as!'

 (Curtius)
'two of his three sons'

 (Cicero)
'they divide the whole thing into two parts'

 '1000' is indeclinable in the singular but variable in the plural:
 (Catullus)
'give me a thousand kisses, then a hundred'

 (Augustus)
'slightly more than 300,000'

When it is plural, the noun it refers to is put in the genitive case:
 (Curtius)
'accompanied by six thousand(s) (of) cavalrymen'

 '1000 paces' (plural ) is the Latin for a mile:
 (Vulgate Bible)
'whoever compels you to walk a mile, go with him another two'

When the number is plural, the genitive  is sometimes omitted:
 (Caesar)
'not further than 10 miles from the town'

Ordinal numerals 
Ordinal numerals all decline like normal first- and second-declension adjectives. When declining two-word ordinals (thirteenth onwards), both words decline to match in gender, number and case.

  'first'
  'second'
  'third'
 / 'twentieth'

Note:  only means 'second' in the sense of 'following'. The adjective  meaning 'other [of two]' was more frequently used in many instances where English would use 'second'.

Ordinal numbers, not cardinal numbers, are commonly used to represent dates, because they are in the format of 'in the tenth year of Caesar', etc. which also carried over into the anno Domini system and Christian dating, e.g.  for AD 100.

 (Caesar)
'he arrived on the seventh day'

Ordinal numerals + -ārius

 (Cicero)
'the leading man of his family'

 (Pliny the Elder)
'five half-pounds of second-class bread'

 (Pliny the Elder)
'lead alloy containing one-third white metal'

 (Livy)
'quarter-pints of wine'

 (Vitruvius)
'five-sixths' (taking a sextārius as the whole)

 (Celsus)
'a pint of oil'

 (Justinian)
'an eighth-part tax'

numerals 
Certain nouns in Latin were plurālia tantum, i.e. nouns that were plural but which had a singular meaning, for example  'a letter',  'a camp',  'a set of chains',  '(a set of) clothes',  'winter quarters',  'wedding',  'quadriga' etc. Thus Roman authors would write:  'one letter',  'three letters',  'five camps', etc.

Except for the numbers 1, 3, and 4 and their compounds, the  numerals are identical with the distributive numerals (see below).

  (Varro) 
'We don't say  (one two-horse chariot),  (two four-horse chariots),  (three weddings) but instead '.
 (Cicero)
'My daughter Tullia came to me ... and delivered (no fewer than) three letters'
 (Caesar)
'Octavius surrounded the town with five camps'

Distributive numerals 
The meaning of these is 'one each', 'two each' (or 'in pairs') and so on, for example 
  (Julius Caesar) 
'there he began erecting towers with three storeys each'
 (Livy)
'a pair of senators was put in charge of each group of soldiers'. 
 (Livy)
'three ambassadors were sent to Africa, and three to Numidia'
 (Livy)
'for each individual cavalryman they gave 25 coins'

The word  is always plural in this sense in the classical period.

The distributive numerals are also used for multiplying:
 (Macrobius)
'three threes, which are nine'

Distributive numerals + -ārius 
Based on the distributive numerals are derived a series of adjectives ending in -ārius:  'unique', 'extraordinary', 'of one part', 'singular',  'of two parts',  'of three parts',  'of four parts', and so on.

Often these adjectives specify the size or weight of something. The usual meaning is 'of so many units', the units being feet, inches, men, pounds, coins, or years, according to context:
 (Columella)
'four-foot ditches, that is, four foot long in every direction'

 (Frontinus)
'a five-digit pipe, named from its diameter of five digits'

 (Curtius)
'five-hundred men battalions'

 (Pliny the Elder)
'a five-hundred pound suit of body armour'

 (Gaius)

They can also be used for specifying age:
 (Pliny the Younger)
'disinherited by her 80-year-old father'

Some of these words have a specialised meaning. The sēnārius was a kind of metre consisting of six iambic feet commonly used in spoken dialogue in Roman comedy.

The dēnārius was a silver coin originally worth ten assēs (but later sixteen assēs); but there was also a gold , mentioned by Pliny the Elder and Petronius, worth 25 silver . The silver  is often mentioned in the New Testament, and was stated to be the day's pay in the parable of the Labourers in the Vineyard.

Adverbial numerals 
Adverbial numerals are (as the name states) indeclinable adverbs, but because all of the other numeral constructions are adjectives, they are listed here with them. Adverbial numerals give how many times a thing happened.  'once',  'twice',  'thrice, three times',  'four times', and so on.

 (Plautus)
'indeed I've said it ten times already'

Multiplicative numerals 

Multiplicative numerals are declinable adjectives.  'single',  'double',  'treble',  'fourfold', and so on.

These numerals decline as 3rd declension adjectives:
 (Caesar)
'(Caesar) arranged his soldiers in a triple line'
 (Suetonius)
'holding a pair of writing tablets consisting of two leaves'

For completeness all the numbers have been given above. Not all of these numerals are attested in ancient books, however. 

Based on this series of numerals there is a series of adverbs:  'simply, frankly',  'doubly, ambiguously',  'in three different ways' etc., as well as verbs such as  'to double',  'to triple',  'to make four times as much', and so on.

Proportional numerals 

Proportional numerals are declinable adjectives.  'simple',  'twice as great',  'thrice as great',  'four times as great', and so on.

These are often used as nouns:  'the simple sum',  'double the amount of money' and so on.

 (Livy)
'double the amount of money to be replaced in the treasuries'

Linguistic details

Cardinal numbers

The numeral  < Old Latin oinos ‘one’, with its cognates Old Irish óen ‘one’, Gothic ains ‘one’, Ancient Greek οἴνη oínē ‘ace on dice’, and the first part of Old Church Slavonic inorogŭ ‘Unicorn’, harks back to Proto-Indo-European *Hoi̯-no-s. The genitive forms  and the dative form  match the pronominal declension (cf. ,  etc.), the remaining forms (including a rare gen. f. ) conform with those of first and second declension adjectives. Nominative and accusative forms persist within the Romance languages as numeral and also in its secondarily acquired role as indefinite article, e. g. Old French and Occitan uns, une, un, Italian un, una, Spanish un, una, Portuguese um, uma, Romanian un, o.

The masculine nominative/accusative forms  < Old Latin  ‘two’ is a cognate to Old Welsh dou ‘two’, Greek δύω dýō ‘two’, Sanskrit दुवा duvā ‘two’, Old Church Slavonic dŭva ‘two’, that imply Proto-Indo-European *duu̯o-h1, a Lindeman variant of monosyllabic *du̯o-h1, living on in Sanskrit द्वा dvā ‘two’, and slightly altered in Gothic twai ‘two’, German zwei ‘two’ etc.; the feminine dŭae points to an ancestral form *duu̯ah2-ih1. Both forms bear a dual ending, which otherwise in Latin is preserved only in  ‘both’, and possibly in octō ‘eight’. The accusative forms  m.,  f., the genitive , classical  m./n.,  f., and the dative/ablative  m./n.,  f., are original Latin formations replicating nominal declension patterns; at times,  stands in for other case forms, especially when combined with invariant numerals, e. g.  ‘twenty-two’,  ‘twenty-eight’.

Most Romance languages sustain an invariant form developed from the masculine accusative duōs > Spanish, Catalan, Occitan dos, French deux, Romansh duos, dus; Italian due seems to preserve the feminine nominative  (or may have evolved from the feminine accusative ).

The masculine and feminine nominative form  ‘three’ and its cognates Gothic þreis ‘three’, Greek τρεῖς treîs ‘three’, Sanskrit त्रयः trayaḥ ‘three’ are based on Proto-Indo-European *trei̯-es; the original accusative form , matching Umbrian trif, Gothic þrins, Old Irish trí, Greek τρίνς tríns < Proto-Indo-European *tri-ns, was being superseded from preclassical Latin onward. The neuter  corresponds to Umbrian triia and Greek τρία tría. The genitive  is a direct descendant of Proto-Indo-European *trii̯-om, unlike e. g. Greek τριῶν triôn with long -ōn < -o-om, taken from the second declension; the dative/ablative form , as well as Umbrian tris < *trifos, sustains Proto-Indo-European *tri-bʰos. The Romance languages only preserve one invariant form reflecting Latin  > Spanish, Catalan, Occitan tres, Portuguese três, French trois, Romansh trais, treis, Romanian trei.

The invariant numeral  ‘four’ does not fully correspond to any of its cognates in other languages, as Oscan petora ‘four’, Greek τέσσαρες téssares ‘four’, Old Irish cethair ‘four’, Gothic fidwôr ‘four’, Lithuanian keturì ‘four’, Old Church Slavonic četyre ‘four’ point to a Proto-Indo-European base *kʷetu̯or-, that should appear as *quetuor in Latin; the actual -a- has been explained as epenthetic vowel emerging from a zero-grade *kʷtu̯or-. The geminate -tt- might have been established to compensate the fluctuating quality of succeeding -u- between non-syllabic glide and full vowel apparent since Old Latin; in the postclassical form quattor this sound is dropped altogether, and in most Romance languages the second syllable is subject to syncope, which then is compensated by an additional vowel at the very end of the word, as in Spanish cuatro, Portuguese quatro, Italian quattro, French, Occitan, Catalan quatre, Romanian patru.

The cardinal number  ‘five’, with its cognates Old Irish coíc ‘five’, Greek πέντε pénte ‘five’, Sanskrit पञ्च pañca ‘five’, leads back to Proto-Indo-European pénkʷe; the long -ī-, confirmed by preserved -i- in most Romance descendants, must have been transferred from the ordinal  ‘fifth’, where the original short vowel had been regularly lengthened preceding a cluster with a vanishing fricative:  < *quiŋxtos < *kʷuiŋkʷtos < *kʷeŋkʷ-to-s. The assimilation of antevocalic *p- to -kʷ- of the following syllable is a common feature of the Italic languages as well as the Celtic languages.

See also 
en.wiktionary.org Appendix:Latin cardinal numerals
Latin numbers 1 - 100
Latin numbers 1 - 1,000,000
a Brief Guide to Latin Numerals

References 

Latin language
Numerals